The Prodigal Son is a 1962 Australian television production of an opera by Debussy. It was directed by Christopher Muir.

It was produced in ABC's Melbourne studios to mark the centenary of Debussy's birth.

References

Australian television plays
Australian television plays based on operas
1962 television plays